The Palestine Cup was a football competition which was held between countries in the Arab world. The tournament de facto acted as the replacement for the Arab Cup during the long interruption between 1966 and 1982, it held on three occasions in Arab countries in the 1970s. The first edition was held in 1972 in Iraq.

History
The cup was established in 1972 at the initiative of Said al-Sabeh, president of the Supreme Council for Palestinian Youth Welfare. The aim of the initiative was to create a new Arab championship that would reunite sport in the Arab countries, as well as with the aim of proving Arab affiliation and support for the Palestinian cause. The tournament was also created to be an alternative to the Arab Cup, which had been suspended after the third edition. Iraq was chosen to host the first edition in the same year, and eight Arab countries took part in the tournament, but only three editions were organised. After the return of the Arab Cup in 1982, the Palestine Cup became a tournament for youth teams under the name Palestine Cup for Youth.

Statistics

Winners

Successful national teams

Summary
Source:

See also
 FIFA Arab Cup

Notes and references

Notes

References

External links
 Palestine Cup of Nations - rsssf.com

 
Palestine
Defunct international association football competitions